Staphylinochrous is a genus of moths in the Anomoeotidae family.

Species
Staphylinochrous albabasis Bethune-Baker, 1911
Staphylinochrous angustifascia Hering, 1937
Staphylinochrous approximata Hering, 1937
Staphylinochrous defasciata Hering, 1937
Staphylinochrous elongata Hering, 1937
Staphylinochrous euryperalis Hampson, 1910
Staphylinochrous euryphaea Hampson, 1920
Staphylinochrous flavida Hampson, 1920
Staphylinochrous fulva Hampson, 1910
Staphylinochrous heringi Alberti, 1954
Staphylinochrous holotherma Hampson, 1920
Staphylinochrous longipennis Hering, 1937
Staphylinochrous meinickei Hering, 1928
Staphylinochrous melanoleuca Hampson, 1910
Staphylinochrous pygmaea Bethune-Baker, 1911
Staphylinochrous ruficilia Hampson, 1920
Staphylinochrous sagittata Hering, 1937
Staphylinochrous sordida Hering, 1937
Staphylinochrous ugandensis Hering, 1937
Staphylinochrous whytei Butler, 1894

Anomoeotidae
Zygaenoidea genera